The 2020 Campeonato Baiano  (officially the Campeonato Baiano de Futebol Profissional Série “A” – Edição 2020) was the 116th edition of Bahia's top professional football league. The competition began on 22 January and ended on 8 August. On 17 March 2020, FBF suspended the Campeonato Baiano indefinitely due to the COVID-19 pandemic in Brazil. The tournament resumed behind closed doors on 23 July 2020.

The finals between Bahia, the defending champions, and Atlético de Alagoinhas finished in a 1–1 draw on aggregate, but Bahia clinched their 49th title by winning 7–6 on penalties.

Format
In the first stage, each team played the other nine teams in a single round-robin tournament. Top four teams advanced to the semi-finals. The team with the lowest number of points was relegated to the Série B do Campeonato Baiano de 2021.

The final stage was played on a home-and-away two-legged basis with the higher-seeded team hosting the second leg. If tied on aggregate, the penalty shoot-out would be used to determine the winner.

Champions qualified for the 2021 Copa do Brasil and 2021 Copa do Nordeste, while runners-up and third place only qualified for the 2021 Copa do Brasil. Top three teams not already qualified for 2021 Série A, Série B or Série C qualified for 2021 Campeonato Brasileiro Série D.

Participating teams

First stage

Final stage

Semi-finals

|}

Group 2

Bahia qualified for the finals.

Group 3

Atlético de Alagoinhas qualified for the finals.

Finals

|}

Group 4

General table

Top goalscorers

References

2020 in Brazilian football leagues
Campeonato Baiano
Campeonato Baiano